Pinapaka Patti Nagar is a small village in Burgampahad mandal in Khammam district, Andhra Pradesh. On one side of the village, Kinnerasaani is there, which is the tributary of Godavari river. Literacy rate in this village is 40-60%. Most of the people are dependent on fields. Total population of the village is 1693 (as per 2011 census), male population is 856 and female population is 837. Total ST population is 242 (14.29%).

Villages in Khammam district